The Moinak Hydro Power Plant (Мойнақ СЭС-і, Moınaq SES-i) is a hydro power plant on the Sharyn River  south of Almaty in Almaty Province of Kazakhstan.  It was commissioned on December 9, 2011, and became fully operational in 2013. It has 2 individual turbines with a nominal output of around 150 MW which deliver up to 300 MW of power and generate 1.027 billion kilowatt-hours of electricity per year. It is funded by  Kazakhstan's and China's National Development Bank and is currently worth around US$300 million.

References

External links

 https://web.archive.org/web/20110707023313/http://eip.cwe.cn/show.aspx?id=93&cid=15

Hydroelectric power stations in Kazakhstan